Hataitai is an inner-city suburb of Wellington, the capital of New Zealand, 3.5 kilometres southeast of the city centre.  The suburb extends over the southeastern flank of Mount Victoria and down a valley between the Town Belt and a ridge along the shoreline of Evans Bay. Hataitai is bounded by Hepara Street, Grafton Road and the suburb of Roseneath in the north, Wellington Harbour in the east, Cobham Drive, Wellington Road and Crawford Road in the south, and Alexandra Road in the west.
  
Hataitai is on important transport links between the central city and Wellington International Airport, to the south of Evans Bay on the isthmus at Rongotai. It is at the eastern end of the Mount Victoria Tunnel and the bus-only Hataitai Tunnel, built in 1907 for trams, making Hataitai a popular place to live.

Origin of name
The earliest European pioneers in Wellington knew the area that became Hataitai as "Jenkins Estate". The ridge of the hill was thought to represent the petrified remains of the great taniwha (sea monster) Whataitai, one of the two creatures who helped form the harbour of Te Whanganui-a-Tara (Wellington Harbour). When one taniwha broke through the rock that separated the then lake from Cook Strait (the story goes), the waters rushed out, leaving Whātaitai stranded on rocks. An earthquake later lifted the monster's body into the hills below Tangi Te Keo (Mount Victoria).

Settlement
Colonial settlement of the area dates from 1841, with land used mainly for farming and grazing. Robert Jenkins acquired a hundred acres of hill pasture. In order to reach it he made a road up Mount Victoria, fenced much of his land and used it for breeding horses. Population was minimal until the late 19th century. In the early days the area was part of Kilbirnie in the Evans Bay district - so the school opened in Moxham Ave in 1884 was called Kilbirnie School. In 1901 the Hataitai Land Company was formed to sell sections on the hillsides north from Waitoa Road, and the area became known as Hataitai. In 1902 the new suburb was advertised by the cutting of gigantic letters spelling 'HATAITAI' in the turf of the town side of Mount Victoria. Many of the streets in Hataitai are named after native trees: Hinau Road, Konini Road, Matai Road, Rata Road, Rewa Road etc.

Significant development took place from the early 20th century into the 1950s, spurred by improved access via the Hataitai bus tunnel (opened in 1907) and the Mt Victoria tunnel (1931). The population increased slightly between 2001 and 2006, a result of new dwellings being added to the area.

Demographics

Hataitai had a population of 5,493 at the 2018 New Zealand census, an increase of 243 people (4.6%) since the 2013 census, and an increase of 324 people (6.3%) since the 2006 census. There were 2,052 households, comprising 2,742 males and 2,754 females, giving a sex ratio of 1.0 males per female, with 876 people (15.9%) aged under 15 years, 1,617 (29.4%) aged 15 to 29, 2,586 (47.1%) aged 30 to 64, and 411 (7.5%) aged 65 or older.

Ethnicities were 85.4% European/Pākehā, 8.4% Māori, 3.8% Pacific peoples, 9.8% Asian, and 4.2% other ethnicities. People may identify with more than one ethnicity.

The percentage of people born overseas was 28.9, compared with 27.1% nationally.

Although some people chose not to answer the census's question about religious affiliation, 59.4% had no religion, 29.0% were Christian, 0.2% had Māori religious beliefs, 1.5% were Hindu, 0.6% were Muslim, 1.1% were Buddhist and 3.1% had other religions.

Of those at least 15 years old, 2,388 (51.7%) people had a bachelor's or higher degree, and 222 (4.8%) people had no formal qualifications. 1,449 people (31.4%) earned over $70,000 compared to 17.2% nationally. The employment status of those at least 15 was that 2,943 (63.7%) people were employed full-time, 654 (14.2%) were part-time, and 177 (3.8%) were unemployed.

Amenities
A small shopping village is centred on Moxham Avenue and Waitoa Road. In 2011 Wellington City Council added Hataitai Village shops to its District Plan list of heritage buildings. The heritage listings mean the buildings are recognised and protected for their heritage value and any major changes to the outside of listed buildings, or demolition of them, would require resource consent. Most of the buildings at the village date from the 1910s and 1920s and together they form a historic streetscape that is rare in Wellington.

Sports facilities include the Badminton Hall on Ruahine Street and Hataitai Park on the Town Belt. Hataitai Park has a velodrome, tennis courts and rugby fields. Other community facilities include a community centre and bowling club, both of which offer venues for community activities, a medical centre, three churches (All Saints Anglican, Hataitai Methodist, Latter-day Saints) and the Treasure Grove and Waipapa Road Play Areas. In addition, the Alexandra Road Play area is accessible from Hepara Street, with a 180 degree view from Wellington Harbour's Eastbourne to Lyall Bay in the South and only a short walk to the Mount Victoria summit.

Education

Primary schools

Other education

The nearest intermediate school is Evans Bay Intermediate School in Kilbirnie.

The nearest state secondary schools are Rongotai College (single-sex boys' school) in Rongotai, and Wellington East Girls' College (single-sex girls' school) in Mt Victoria. There are also two state-integrated Catholic secondary schools nearby: St Patrick's College (for boys) and St Catherine's College (for girls), both in Kilbirnie.

The suburb also has a playcentre and two kindergartens.

External links

References

Suburbs of Wellington City
Populated places around the Wellington Harbour